The Southern Railway Maunsell carriage was the first design family of railway carriages built by Richard Maunsell for the Southern Railway (SR) in the United Kingdom. Following grouping in 1923, SR had continued to build carriages to the designs of the previous three main companies (the London and South Western Railway, London, Brighton and South Coast Railway and South Eastern and Chatham Railway railways), and the Maunsell carriage was intended to be the standard carriage design for use across the Southern Railway lines, incorporating the best features of each of the former companies' designs.

The Southern Railway believed in sets of carriages where groups of carriages stayed together for long periods of time. The set number always appeared at the brake end.

Construction
In 1925, the first order was placed for the first Maunsell carriage. The coaches were 59 ft long with a width of 9 ft 3 in and a height of 12 ft 4 in. The bogies were SR built, with an 8 ft wheelbase. The third class compartments were 6 ft 3 in wide seating four passengers per side, while the first class compartments were 7 ft 1  in wide and seated three passengers per side.

The body frame was mostly made of wood with steel sheeting, the roof was made of wood with canvas over it, and the guard and luggage compartments had a width of 8 ft 7 in, with pressed steel bracket/inserts between the differences in widths from luggage to passenger compartments. The decision regarding gangways was decided in January 1924, with Pullman Gangways being adopted.

In total, over 1,200 Maunsell Carriages were built, with 139 sets being formed.

Early 59 ft corridor stock
The first batch of coaches were built for the West of England as three-coach sets with a third brake, composite and a second third brake being in the set. Ten sets were constructed, with numbers 390-399. The first batch was completed in October 1926. The seating capacity for a three-coach set was very low, with 24 first-class and 88 third-class seats. After the first batch, orders for a total of sixteen sets were completed by 1929.

59 ft corridor stock (1929-1934)

In 1929, Maunsell modified his design to have high corridor windows, but the corridor windows at the ends of the coaches remained the same height to allow a destination board to be attached. The design was authorised in April 1928 and the first order was for the Hastings line which required the coach width to be 8 ft 0  in, this was due to clearance issues. First Class compartments only seated two each side, Third Class three each side and roof board brackets were above the rain strip. Also in the order were coaches for the Folkestone line which required a width of 8 ft 6 in. 
A total of 77 sets were completed by 1934.

Later 59 ft corridor stock
In early 1933, the Southern Railway announced that 1,065 Maunsell carriages were built. Most of the carriages built after 1934 were flushed sided and each toilet now had two sliding ventilator glasses, there were a few other minor alterations. Forty-six sets were built.

Maunsell Post Office vans
In 1923, the Southern Railway inherited two main TPO services from the London and South Western Railway and South Eastern and Chatham Railway. The services were provided by pre-grouping carriages, but in 1936 a pre production model No. 4919  was built and an order placed in 1939 for a Maunsell-designed Post Office sorting van (POSV) with two types: a sorting van of which four were built (including a pre-production model) and a tender van (POTV) of which four were built; they both have offset gangways.

Three examples have been preserved, two POSVs, 4922 at the Bluebell Railway and 4920 the Nene Valley Railway, and one POTV, 4958, at the Pontypool and Blaenavon Railway.

Maunsell push-pull sets
In 1959, British Railways (BR) started to convert twenty Maunsell brake composites and open seconds. The brake composites in each set had the lavatory sealed off and the gangway at the brake end removed. A driving end was provided with two small windows fitted overlooking the track. The Open Seconds had their lavatories removed and sealed off and gangway to the locomotive end removed. The sets were numbered 600 - 619.

In preservation, two driving brake corridor and an open third survived, No. 6699, 6697 and 1323, all of which are at the Swanage Railway. The Swanage Railway want to create an authentic push-pull set with 6699 and 1323, forming Set No. 619.

Southern Railway use
The first sets that entered service in 1935 were assigned to the west area of the network and gradually spread all over the network, The Maunsell coaching stock gradually replacing old pre-grouping stock. The coaches were always operated in sets with loose stock placed in sets when carriages were in overhaul.

Accidents involving Maunsell-built coaches 1927-1947
Sevenoaks, 24 August 1927. 5:00 pm Cannon Street to Deal eight-car train derailed with four coaches damaged beyond repair.
Dover Marine, July 1935. Four coaches destroyed by fire.
Micheldever, 15 August 1936. A fire broke out on the 4:58 pm Channel Islands boat train, destroying four coaches in the resulting blaze.
Swanley Junction, March 1938. Two coaches including a Thanet Composite were fire damaged.
Haywards Heath, 2 September 1945. Shunting accident which killed two, two coaches destroyed.
Woking, 10 November 1945. The 4:54 pm Waterloo to Basingstoke train struck the 5.00 pm Waterloo to Exeter train. Some major damage to coaches.
Catford, 20 September 1946. The 2:10 pm Victoria to Ramsgate train derailed which killed one, three coaches destroyed.
Farnborough, 26 November 1947. 3:05 pm Ilfracombe to Waterloo train collided at 20 mph into the back of the Bournemouth to Waterloo train killing one person and destroying three carriages.
During World War II between 1940 and 1944, sixteen Southern Railway-built coaches were destroyed in a number of different raids, and many more were damaged but repaired and returned to service.

Liveries
Maunsell stock in the Southern Railway had two main liveries, the first of which was introduced by Maunsell and lasted to 1939 before Bulleid modernized the coloring in 1940.
 SR Maunsell olive green (1924–1939; introduced as the first standard passenger livery for the Southern Railway)
 SR Bulleid malachite green (1939–1950; became standard livery for all Southern passenger locomotives)

British Railway use
The policy under which the Southern Railway operated set trains continued into the Southern Region of British Railways; sets were disbanded and created as BR tried to create a new timetable. Since 1949, the official livery for all main line coaches had been crimson and cream, in seven years the whole of the Southern Region fleet should be crimson and cream but that wasn't the case as many sets were still in Southern Railway malachite green. In 1959, as the Kent Coast electrification scheme was completed most restriction '0' were withdrawn at the same time. This decline continued as BR had more modern Bulleid and Mark 1 coaching stock until 1967 where the last was withdrawn. Many Maunsell coaches were sold by BR to heritage railways were they restored and operated.

Preservation
The carriages are well represented in preservation, with 33 preserved on heritage railways across the country. Two driving brake composite, four corridor composite, five brake third corridor two are under frames, one dining saloon, one kitchen first, two brake corridor composite, four brake unclassed open, five third open, two Post Office sorting van, two corridor third (one is an underframe), one corridor first under frame, one open second under frame, one Post Office tender van, and two unknown underframe.

References

Southern Railway (UK)
Railway coaches of the United Kingdom